The COVID-19 pandemic in the Republic of Ireland has impacted the country's judicial system. Several people were arrested for COVID-19-related offences, while prisoners were released. Two operations, Operation Fanacht and Operation Navigation, were launched.

Overall context
The Garda Síochána (Irish police) announced differences to the way its shifts would operate to allow for increased presence of its officers in public, that hundreds of student gardaí would be sworn in to the force earlier than would otherwise have been the case and that more than 200 private hire cars would be deployed to assist vulnerable citizens in rural areas after being branded with the Garda sign and crest. In addition, a supply of masks would be maintained to distribute within the prison system if inmates showed symptoms of the SARS‑CoV‑2 virus. It also set up a national COVID-19 unit located at its Phoenix Park headquarters.

On 20 March 2020, Minister for Justice Charles Flanagan announced that immigration permissions set to expire from 20 March to 20 May would be granted a two-month extension. He also announced the temporary release of prisoners. The Irish Naturalisation and Immigration Service on Dublin's Burgh Quay shut due to the virus and applications instead went online. Asylum seekers in the east of the country were rendered homeless after spending time in hospital with the virus; "health sources" informed the Irish Examiner that one man was forced to spend further time in hospital than he needed and a second man was "left to fend for himself". On 18 April, after persistent rumours, an outbreak of the virus was confirmed amongst asylum seekers who had recently been housed in a hotel in the southwestern town of Cahersiveen; management agreed to confine the asylum seekers to the hotel so as to protect the local population, though they had been using local supermarkets and pharmacies before this date, to the annoyance of local business and community leaders whom the HSE had promised it would notify of any outbreak but who did not find out until they approached the hotel. Locals protested, asked for it to be shut and called for an inquiry into how the asylum seekers had been moved there from elsewhere amid a pandemic. Flanagan's private secretary wrote a letter to a local politician informing him that those managing such centres had been asked to improve their standard of cleaning. Asylum seekers in Cahersiveen continued to display symptoms and test positive for the virus into May. In mid-May, Minister Flanagan issued an open letter to the people of County Kerry, with particular reference to the residents of Cahersiveen, acknowledging the hardship they had experienced as a result of the presence of the asylum seekers in their town and outlining the infection control measures that were in place to deal with the problem. Local newspapers in the county carried the letter. The letter was four pages in length and the Irish Examiner called it an "unprecedented" apology.

Prisoners were reported to be willing to work with prison officers to prevent their exposure to the virus. Social distancing measures in prisons included visible marks, the closing of gyms and recreation halls, inmates being fed in smaller groups and visits from outside disallowed. Deep cleaning occurred, the plates and mugs were replaced with hot food in single use cardboard containers. Another consequence of the virus was that less drugs found their way into the system, or as one prisoner put it: "It's not only harder to get the drugs in, it's harder to get the drugs, full stop". This was attributed both to the restrictions and the heavier garda presence on streets.

On 7 April, Minister for Health Simon Harris signed regulations under provisions inserted in emergency legislation passed earlier, to restrict movement of persons and the holding of events, effective 8 to 12 April. This move, which Harris confirmed on Prime Time, gave gardaí extra powers to coincide with the Easter period. On 10 April, these measures were extended to 5 May.

On 28 April, it was reported that 76 people had been arrested for failing to comply with gardaí policing the pandemic. On 12 May, gardaí reported having had to use their emergency powers on 192 occasions between 8 April (the first day) and 9 May. On 19 May, gardaí reported using emergency powers 241 times between 8 April and 16 May.

On 13 May, Garda HQ circulated a letter announcing the suspension for budgetary purposes of overtime available to serving officers in certain cases.

On the morning of 18 March, masks were distributed to gardaí, with instructions to wear them during time spent in enclosed spaces (such as in vehicles or on public transport) and during prolonged contact with others (though not in the open air or at checkpoints).

On 10 June, it was announced that not a single prisoner among the country's prison population of 3,705 had tested positive for COVID-19.

On 22 August, a 23-year-old woman in Dóchas Centre became the first prisoner in Ireland to test positive for COVID-19.

On 29 September, following crime figures published by the Central Statistics Office, the number of burglaries dropped by 52.8% between March and June, coinciding with the imposition of COVID-19 restrictions.

On 30 October, the Irish Prison Service confirmed an outbreak of COVID-19 at the Midlands Prison after five inmates tested positive for COVID-19.

On 5 January 2021, the Irish Prison Service announced that five prisoners in Loughan House Open Centre in County Cavan tested positive for COVID-19.

On 17 February, the Irish Prison Service announced that three prisoners in the Midlands Prison tested positive for COVID-19.

On 10 May, the Irish Prison Service confirmed that an outbreak of 19 cases of COVID-19 had been identified at Mountjoy Prison.

On 10 November, Cloverhill Prison in Dublin announced that it was responding to a suspected COVID-19 outbreak, after the Irish Prison Service confirmed that one prisoner tested positive for COVID-19.

Assaults
Assaults of coughing and spitting were rife. They occurred nationwide, in the capital city Dublin, and were also recorded in the counties of Cavan, Cork, Donegal, Dublin, Kildare, Louth, Roscommon, Sligo, Tipperary, Waterford.

On 23 March 2020, a man appeared at Blanchardstown Hospital, saying he had COVID-19 symptoms and wanted to be tested. He proceeded to either spit or cough at a nurse, who was then forced into self-isolation—it later emerged that her attacker was COVID-19 positive.

On 24 March, a man and a woman launched a coughing attack into the face of Minister for Health Simon Harris near Government Buildings, his assailants then running off laughing.

On 28 March, 32-year-old Tariq Jagoe from Killiney spat at others on board a Dublin Bus and told gardaí he would give them COVID-19 when they were called to the scene of the disruption at Lord Edward Street in the city centre; a judge cited the virus in his objection to bail and ordered Jagoe to be given a COVID-19 test when he learned that he had not yet received one.

Rachel Conway from Caltragh in County Sligo coughed at a garda and was sentenced to 28 days imprisonment, meaning she was the first person jailed for a COVID-related offence.

Gardaí ordered 16,000 spit hoods (to cover the face of suspects inclined towards these acts), and warned the public that anyone caught would be charged with assault.

On 28 April, Garda Commissioner Drew Harris said that—since 8 April—gardaí had been spat at or coughed-on on 31 occasions and that spit hoods had been required on 15 occasions. On 5 May, Harris said that between 8 April and 2 May, gardaí had been spat at or coughed on on 52 occasions and that spit hoods had been required on 28 occasions. On 9 June, Harris said that between 8 April and 6 June, gardaí had been spat at or coughed-on on 93 occasions and that spit hoods had been required on 70 occasions.

On 14 March 2021, two men in their 20s were charged after three Gardaí were assaulted following a house party in Milford, County Donegal on 13 March.

Other offences
On 21 March 2020, Gardaí in Longford were called to a house where a 21st birthday party was underway to disperse dozens of young people who gathered in violation of social distancing.

A burglary in late-March on the LÉ George Bernard Shaw—docked at Sir John Rogerson's Quay along the River Liffey in Dublin to offer assistance to the Health Service Executive—led to the arrest of a man and a prompt appearance before court.

On 31 March, €70,000 of suspected heroin was seized during a COVID-19 patrol on the M8 motorway in Fermoy, and one man arrested.

On 6 April, more than €51,000 of suspected cocaine was seized during a COVID-19 patrol in Waterford, and one man arrested.

An underage session being conducted by the GAA via Zoom was "hacked and bombarded with pornographic images" in early April; gardaí received word of the incident.

In mid-April, Martin Stokes of Clondalkin, who had failed to reappear at court three years previously to face charges of tax fraud dating from 2006, 2008 and 2011 (and to which he had pleaded guilty), was arrested while travelling around during the restrictions in April; the judge refused bail.

On 15 April, 24-year-old Denis Constantin of Enniscorthy in the southeast of the country became the first person charged with breaching the two-kilometre movement restriction when he appeared before a court in Gorey; the judge refused bail after gardaí had twice stopped him while driving over the previous (Easter) weekend in a position that was more than two kilometres from his home: close to Bunclody on Good Friday and close to New Ross on the morning of Easter Monday. He was also charged for driving with no licence or insurance while disqualified. He was jailed for 3 months for breaching the two-kilometre movement restriction.

On the morning of 16 April, a man was arrested and charged following a public order and assault incident at a checkpoint in Muckmoyne, Boyle, County Roscommon; the man would not co-operate and became aggressive, including spitting.

On 21 April, suspected drugs worth €230,000 were seized during a COVID-19 patrol in Limerick, and two people were arrested.

On the morning of 24 April, a man from Ballymun was arrested and later charged with four breaches of the Health (Preservation and Protection and other Emergency Measures in the Public Interest) Act 2020.

On 19 May, it was reported that a "serial offender" and driver of a Škoda, who continued to steal fuel from petrol stations in breach of COVID-19 travel restrictions so that he could service his cocaine debt, was banned from driving for two years and received a four-month suspended sentence.

On 27 May, four men from Brazil were arrested and charged with two charges of possession of firearms and a breach of COVID-19 travel restrictions. They were arrested at 12 midnight near Clara, County Offaly, while travelling in two vehicles. All four men were brought separately to Portlaoise District Court on the morning of 29 May.

On 18 June, it was reported that a 17-year-old teenager became the first juvenile to face court charges for breaching COVID-19 travel restrictions. The breaches are alleged to have occurred in Blanchardstown, Dublin, on 25 April, in County Limerick on 27 April and in Clondalkin, Dublin, on 28 April.

On 2 October, as part of a policing plan at the University of Limerick, gardaí in Castletroy, Limerick shut down 35 student house parties, arrested 5 people for public order offences and trespassing offences, and issued 30 anti-social behaviour warnings and 70 on the spot ticket fines; 45 for alcohol consumption; 25 for illegal parking.

On the night of 19 December, gardaí broke up an organised "car meet" of 800 people in more than 250 cars that breached COVID-19 regulations in Little Island, County Cork.

On the night of 2 March 2021, three men in their 20s were arrested and more than 50 fixed payment notices were issued in Limerick after Gardaí broke up a street party involving large groups of students drinking, dancing, singing and setting of fireworks, near the University of Limerick. The next day on 3 March, one of the three men arrested was charged with public order offences, while Minister for Justice Helen McEntee urged young people to comply with COVID-19 restrictions.

On 12 March, Gardaí confirmed that two people were arrested and more than 80 fines were issued after around 300 people gathered for the funeral of a young Traveller man in Carrick-on-Shannon on 11 March, despite Level 5 restrictions limiting mourners to 10 people.

On 29 May, four people were arrested for public order offences after large crowds gathered in parts of Dublin city centre, while Chief Medical Officer Tony Holohan stated that he was "absolutely shocked" by the crowds that gathered.

Riots occurred during the 2021 June bank holiday weekend in Dublin city centre. On the night of 4 June, 14 people (including 5 juveniles) were arrested for public order offences and a Garda received hospital treatment, after violence broke out in Dublin city centre in which glass bottles were thrown at Gardaí, which resulted in a patrol car being damaged. Minister for Health Stephen Donnelly described the incidents as "thuggish behaviour and completely unacceptable". On the night of 5 June, 19 people (including 2 juveniles) were arrested for public order offences and two Gardaí received hospital treatment, after violence broke out in Dublin's south city centre for a second consecutive night in which a person was assaulted, a bin was set on fire and glass bottles were thrown, which resulted in a patrol car being damaged. On the night of 6 June, 14 people (including 3 juveniles) were arrested for public order offences, after violence broke out in Dublin's south city centre for a third consecutive night, while Gardaí arrested 8 people in Cork.

On the night of 14 July, hundreds of people gathered outside the Convention Centre in Dublin to protest against the Government's response to the COVID-19 pandemic after the Dáil passed legislation to allow for the reopening of indoor dining.

On 24 July, around 1,500 protestors gathered in Dublin city centre to protest against vaccines, new legislation allowing for the reopening of indoor dining and the EU Digital COVID Certificate.

On 22 August, following crowds of people gathering after the 2021 All-Ireland Senior Hurling Championship Final, Gardaí began investigating alleged breaches of COVID-19 regulations at a pub near Croke Park, while several pubs were temporarily shut by Gardaí due to anti-social behaviour and a lack of social distancing.

On 5 November, 17 people were arrested following an investigation into suspected COVID-19 social welfare fraud at a number of business premises in Dublin.

Anti-lockdown protests
On 22 August 2020, four men were arrested after around 500 people attended an anti-lockdown rally organised by the Yellow Vests Ireland group at Custom House Quay in Dublin.

On 12 September, around 3,000 attended two anti-mask protests organised by the Yellow Vests Ireland group at Custom House Quay in Dublin. The next day on 13 September, gardaí began an investigation of an assault of an activist following clashes between an anti-mask group and a counter-protest outside Leinster House.

On 10 October, two men were arrested after a total of 250 demonstrators attended an anti-lockdown protest organised by the National Party outside Leinster House in Dublin.

On 27 February 2021, 23 people were arrested and 3 Gardaí were injured (including one hospitalised), as around 500 protesters took part in an anti-lockdown protest in Dublin city centre, with fireworks being fired at Gardaí, while St Stephen's Green and the Iveagh Gardens closed in advance of the protest. The protest was widely condemned by the gardaí and politicians. Taoiseach Micheál Martin stated that he "utterly condemned" the protest, which "posed an unacceptable risk to both the public and Gardaí" and also praised the Gardaí who moved quickly to make arrests and restore order. Tánaiste Leo Varadkar stated that he was horrified and that there was no excuse for violence to Gardaí or anyone, while Minister for Justice Helen McEntee stated that the situation was "completely unacceptable and was an insult to so many who had worked so hard in the fight against COVID-19 and to those who had died". The violent protest resulted in 13 people, including 12 men and 1 woman, charged and remanded in custody for public order offences, while Tánaiste Leo Varadkar stated that the violence on the streets of Dublin was "not a protest and was a riot". On 2 March, a man in his 30s was arrested in connection with the firework attack on Gardaí at the violent anti-lockdown protest on 27 February. The next day on 3 March, Jake Merriman, a 30-year-old man, appeared in court charged in connection with the firework attack on Gardaí. Seven months later on 28 October, Merriman was further charged with endangerment of life by launching a firework at Gardaí. He was accused of possessing glass bottles capable of causing serious injury, violent disorder, and endangering life by propelling a lighted firework causing a substantial risk of death or serious harm.

On 6 March, Gardaí arrested 6 people (5 men and 1 woman) as around 450 people attended an anti-lockdown protest in Cork city centre that ended without incident.

On 16 March, the Garda Síochána urged people to stay at home for St Patrick's Day as a significant policing operation was put in place to deal with planned protests in Dublin city with 2,500 Gardaí being deployed across the country. Gardaí continued to carry out checkpoints focused on non-essential travel, patrolling at public amenities, road safety activity, managing any large gatherings that may occur and providing support for the vulnerable, including victims of domestic violence.

On St Patrick's Day 2021, Gardaí arrested 21 people after around 700 protestors took part in a number of anti-lockdown protests in Dublin city centre, Herbert Park and at the RTÉ campus in Donnybrook. One day later on 18 March, it was confirmed that 7 Gardaí were injured (including five hospitalised) after being kicked, punched and spat at during the separate violent anti-lockdown protests that took place on St Patrick's Day.

On 20 March, Gardaí arrested 11 people and issued a number of fines after around 200 protestors took part in an anti-lockdown protest in the Phoenix Park in Dublin city centre.

On 3 April, around 300 protestors took part in an anti-lockdown protest at the National Monument on the Grand Parade in Cork city centre. One day later on 4 April (Easter Sunday), Gardaí arrested 8 people as part of a policing plan around an anti-lockdown protest planned in Dublin city centre.

On 1 May, around 370 protestors took part in an anti-lockdown protest at the National Monument on the Grand Parade in Cork city centre.

On 3 July, more than 300 protestors took part in an anti-lockdown protest in Dublin city centre.

On 27 November, thousands of people attended a protest against COVID-19 restrictions and vaccine passports at the GPO on Dublin's O'Connell Street.

On 22 January 2022, despite the easing of almost all COVID-19 restrictions, around 1,000 people gathered at the Garden of Remembrance in Dublin city centre calling for the end of all restrictions and the end of face masks for children in schools.

Operation Fanacht

Operation Fanacht ("staying") commenced at 12 noon on Wednesday 8 April 2020 and continued until the night of Monday 13 April, lasting therefore for the busiest part of the Easter period. Its purpose was to enforce travel restrictions which had then only recently been imposed to combat the virus. The Garda Síochána described it as follows in its statement announcing the end of the operation: "Every day of Operation Fanacht, An Garda Síochána conducted 150 permanent checkpoints on major routes, over 500 shorter and mobile checkpoints, as well as a large number of high visibility patrols at tourist locations, natural beauty spots, and parks and beaches". Also as part of Operation Fanacht, the Garda Air Support Unit (GASU) confirmed its helicopters were conducting aerial surveillance of locations suspected as being used by large numbers of people while not adhering to social distancing. Gardaí declared Operation Fanacht a success after only seven arrests. One of these was a 36-year-old man who drove from Derry (in the north of the country) to Kerry (in the southwest of the country), his initial purpose being as an employee of a security firm (for which he had no evidence), while his second excuse was the purchase of two puppies; gardaí stopped him for the first incident at Dooneen outside Castleisland and for the second incident outside Killarney. He appeared at court in Tralee and was imprisoned for four weeks.

Earlier, on 9 April, 20,000 unstamped cigarettes worth more than €10,000 were seized at a COVID-19 checkpoint in Bohola, County Mayo. On 10 April, more than €6,300 of cocaine was seized at a COVID-19 checkpoint. On 13 April (the Easter Monday public holiday), two women raced past a garda checkpoint in Lifford, County Donegal, and headed eastwards across the border. The PSNI seized their vehicle (abandoned near Clady, County Tyrone) and fined both ladies under the legislation, Health Protection Regulations NI 2020 (Coronavirus Restrictions), for good measure. In the early hours of 14 April, gardaí in Dublin arrested two men and one woman and seized two guns and €500,000 in cocaine at the conclusion of a car chase that got underway at a COVID-19 checkpoint on the Phibsborough Road.

Operation Fanacht recommenced for the May bank holiday weekend, began at 7:00 am on Tuesday 28 April and continued until the end of Monday 4 May. It again involved large-scale checkpoints on many main routes, and thousands of mobile checkpoints on secondary routes and in towns and villages. One man was arrested after breaching the travel restrictions thrice on one day of the May bank holiday weekend; after being warned for being in the company of people from other households and while walking elsewhere in the same town, he was arrested after refusing to leave a house party in the south of the country. Another man, who was stopped in Dublin as he set out towards County Meath for a painting job, complained that he "would not be adhering to restrictions from a non-elected government". On the evening of 3 April, €9,000 of cocaine was seized at a COVID-19 checkpoint on the M6 motorway near Ballinasloe in County Galway, and one man arrested.

Operation Fanacht recommenced for the June bank holiday weekend, began on Wednesday 27 May and continued until the end of Monday 1 June. It involved scaled-down checkpoints on many main routes, parks, beaches and beauty spots in towns and villages, focusing on road safety rather than enforcing the COVID-19 travel restrictions, after it was reported that sixty people had been killed in 56 crashes as of 27 May. Numerous checkpoints were mounted throughout Kerry, Cork and Wicklow after a number of motorists breached COVID-19 travel restrictions. On 28 May, it was reported that gardaí turned away over 100 cars in County Wicklow. On 29 May, Gardaí reported several vehicles illegally parked on double yellow lines at a beach in County Wicklow.

Operation Fanacht recommenced on 8 August in counties Kildare, Laois and Offaly following the reimposition of lockdown measures in the three counties. It again involved large-scale checkpoints on many main routes near the borders of the three counties to ensure the public are complying with the new government restrictions announced by Taoiseach Micheál Martin on 7 August.

Operation Fanacht recommenced on 19 September in Dublin City and County following the imposition of Level 3 restrictions in the capital. It involved targeted patrols, checkpoints to monitor compliance with the public health measures and high levels of garda visibility on foot, in car and on bike to monitor social distancing and gatherings in large groups at amenities and open spaces.

Operation Fanacht recommenced on the night of 25 September in Donegal following the imposition of Level 3 restrictions. It involved targeted patrols, checkpoints to monitor compliance with the public health measures and high levels of garda visibility on foot, in car and on bike to monitor social distancing and gatherings in large groups at amenities and open spaces.

Operation Fanacht recommenced on the night of 6 October across the entire country following the imposition of Level 3 restrictions. It involved large-scale checkpoints mounted per day on many main routes, and thousands of mobile checkpoints on secondary routes and in towns and villages.

Operation Fanacht recommenced on 22 October across the entire country following the imposition of Level 5 lockdown restrictions. It involved 132 large-scale checkpoints mounted per day on many main routes, parks, natural beauty spots and public amenities, and hundreds of rolling checkpoints on secondary routes and in towns and villages, as well as over 2,500 gardaí on duty, with the primary focus being on checkpoints and high visibility patrolling. On the night when Level 5 restrictions began, €450 of cannabis and a grinder was seized at a COVID-19 checkpoint in Cork City.

After restrictions eased in early December 2020, a third wave of COVID-19 rapidly arrived in Ireland following the Christmas period which resulted in the reimposition of full Level 5 lockdown restrictions. Operation Fanacht recommenced at 7:00 am on Thursday 7 January 2021 across the entire country, which involved additional static checkpoints on national routes and supported by local mobile checkpoints nationwide. On 14 January, Gardaí issued 29 fines to people breaching the 5 km travel limit over the previous 7 days including three people who travelled 80 km to "collect burgers from a takeaway" in Ringsend, Dublin. On the evening of 24 March, a man was arrested after €140,000 worth of suspected cannabis herb was seized during a checkpoint operation in County Cork.

Operation Navigation
Operation Navigation commenced at 7:00pm on Friday 3 July 2020 when gardaí began conducting checks of licensed premises throughout the country to check if they are adhering to the public health guidelines for COVID-19. Under phase three of the government's roadmap of easing restrictions, pubs that only serve food are allowed to open, and patrons must show proof of having eaten a meal costing at least €9 if gardaí arrive for an inspection. From 3 July to 12 July, Garda Síochána conducted 2,785 checks on licensed premises nationwide.

Pub owners began breaching COVID-19 restrictions on 9 July when gardaí found 26 breaches in 37 individual cases during the first weekend of inspections. On 15 July, a further 11 breaches were found by gardaí, bringing the total number of breaches to 37.

On 29 July, it was announced that the majority of the incidents relate to a lack of evidence that food was being served or consumed and no evidence of receipts to show that food had been sold.

On 21 December, the Garda Síochána announced it continues to detect breaches of COVID-19 regulations at licensed premises nationwide while a pub in the northwest of Ireland was given the first "Immediate Closure Order" by Gardaí under the COVID-19 Enforcement Powers Act 2020.

References

Bibliography

Crime in the Republic of Ireland
2020 in the Republic of Ireland
2021 in the Republic of Ireland
Ireland
Crime
2020 crimes in the Republic of Ireland